Betty Boop's Double Shift is a puzzle game, developed and published by DSI Games. The game is based on the popular Betty Boop cartoon series.

Gameplay

The gameplay is similar to the Diner Dash formula. Betty Boop must move from table to table in order to serve her customers in a timely manner, but if she takes too much time, customers will get angry and leave. After a while, however, Betty Boop's Double Shift changes gears, and becomes a game more akin to Elite Beat Agents. Betty gets called to the front of the diner to sing a song, and the player must tap the stylus on the buttons that correspond to the note she sings.

Reception
Critical reaction has been overwhelmingly negative. Nintendojo, which gave it a 3.0 out of 10, criticized the unresponsive touch controls, and the game's lack of originality. IGN came down on the game for being a clone of Diner Dash and Cake Mania, and gave the game a 4.5 out of 10.

References

External links
Nintendojo Review
IGN Review
GameSpot Profile Page

2007 video games
Betty Boop
Nintendo DS games
Nintendo DS-only games
Video games based on animated television series
Video games featuring female protagonists
Multiplayer and single-player video games
Destination Software games
Video games developed in the United States
Black Lantern Studios games